Ren Han (born February 27, 1984, in Tianjin) is a Chinese contemporary artist.

Biography
Ren Han was born in 1984 in Tianjin, China. He graduated from the Oil Painting Department of the Tianjin Academy of Fine Arts in 2006, then he graduated from the Villa Arson(Ecole Nationale Supérieure d’Art in Nice) in 2011 and obtained the DNSEP (National Superior Diploma of Expression of Plastic Arts). In the same year, he was selected for the Jeune Creation in France. In 2017 Ren Han won the Rock Award from Wang Shikuo Art Foundation and Today Art Museum. In 2019 he was selected for the Salon de Montrouge and received the fellowship from the French Ministry of Culture, Department of Hauts-de-Seine and city of Montrouge.

Ren Han's work can be regarded as a series of systematic researches on artistic creation, image, and visual experience, which are deeply rooted in the context of visual cultural consumption in the post-network era. His works include drawings, installations, and site-specific works. He reproduces and processes ready-made objects/images. The strange and primitive relationship between human beings and nature is the theme often discussed by Ren Han. He questions the meaning of human beings’ continuous construction and destruction driven by desire. The duality presented in his works not only denote the eternal co-existence of binary oppositions of self and other, but also the philosophical relationships of mind and matter, mind and body, as well as man and nature.

In addition to his work as an artist, He is also the co-founder of the Space Regeneration Projects.

Exhibitions

Selected solo exhibitions 

2020 
 "Bibliothèque de Ren Han", Yishu 8 Chez Tante Martine, Paris, France
2019 
 "Solo Show", Raibaudi Wang Gallery, Paris
2017 
 "Void and Ashes", Qi Mu Space, Beijing
2016 
 "Mirror Image", C-Space, Beijing
2015 
 "Emergence", LAB 47, Beijing
2014 
 "Emulating Nature", C-Space, Beijing
2012 
 "Studiolo #2", Less Is More Projects, Paris

Selected group exhibitions 
2021  
 Wake-Up Call, Poush Manifesto, Paris
2020  
 A Kind of Form, Song Art District, Beijing
2019  
 A Ten Year, OWSPACE X Taikang Space, Aranya
 64e Salon de Montrouge, Le Beffroi, Montrouge
2017  
 A New Collection of Poetry, AMNUA, Nanjing
 Amassing Force – 2017 Wang Shikuo Award: Exhibition of Nominated Contemporary Artists, Today Art Museum, Beijing
 Multiple Halo, XI Contemporary Center, Dongguan
2016  
 Puzzles, OCAT Xi'an, Xi'an
 Up-Youth: Young Artists Experiment Field, Beijing Times Art Museum, Beijing
 Ghost in Flash: After Photography, Taikang Space, Beijing
2015  
 JIMEI x ARLES International Photo Festival| Engine: The Imagetriggered Mechanism of Artistic Production, Jiageng Art Center, Xiamen
 24 Art Project – Naissance, Today Art Museum, Beijing
2014  
 Everyday Anxiety – the 5th Jinan International Photography Biennial, Art Museum of Shandong University of Art & Design, Jinan
 Look Into the Far Horizon – New Voices of Chinese Contemporary Art, Musée des Arts Asiatiques, Nice
 Paper Being, Tianjin Art Museum, Tianjin
2013  
 Unboundedness, China Cultural Center in Berlin, Berlin
 ABC, Austrian Embassy in China, Beijing
 Consciousness – Exhibition of Tianjin Contemporary Artists, Tianjin Art Museum, Tianjin
 Contemporary Spirituality, Eglise Saint-Louis de l'hôpital de la Pitié Salpêtrière, Paris
2012  
 New Directions: Young Chinese Contemporary Artists, Moscow Museum of Modern Art, Moscow
2011   
 Jeune Création 2011, Centquatre, Paris
 Demain C’est Loin, Galerie de la Marine and Villa Arson, Nice

References

External links
Official website(en)(zh)
Artfacts
ARTLINKART
Salon de Montrouge

Bibliography
  Jeune Creation 2011, Association Jeune Creation, 2011
  Elfi Turpin, Supplément Semaine Volume VI – Demain c'est loin, Analogues, 2011
  Serghei Litvin, FID 2011, Le livredart, 2011

Chinese contemporary artists
Artists from Tianjin
1984 births
Living people
21st-century Chinese artists